Vijay Singh Solanki is an Indian politician and a member of the Indian National Congress party.

Political career 
He became an MLA in 2013 Madhya Pradesh Legislative Assembly election.

Personal life 
He is married to Mrs. Ushabai and has two sons.

See also 
 Madhya Pradesh Legislative Assembly
 2013 Madhya Pradesh Legislative Assembly election

References

External links 

Madhya Pradesh MLAs 2013–2018
Indian National Congress politicians from Madhya Pradesh
Living people
Year of birth missing (living people)